Access Hollywood, formerly known as Access from 2017 to 2019, is an American weekday television entertainment news program that premiered on September 9, 1996. It covers events and celebrities in the entertainment industry. It was created by former Entertainment Tonight executive producer Jim Van Messel, and is currently executive produced by Maureen FitzPatrick and directed by Richard Plotkin. In previous years, Doug Dougherty, Christopher A. Berry and Kim Anastasia directed the program. Access Hollywood primarily focuses on news in the music, television, and film industries.

History

Access Hollywood has aired nationally on various local stations, most of them affiliates of NBC, in the United States since September 9, 1996.  It was previously produced by NBC Studios and has changed distributors over the years, first with New World/Genesis Distribution, then 20th Television (after News Corporation bought New World), followed by Warner Bros. Domestic Television Distribution who still distributes the show today via barter ad-sales, and then to NBC Enterprises when the network started up its own syndication division. Today, NBCUniversal Television Distribution, in association with NBC's owned-and-operated station KNBC has been solely responsible for its production and distribution since 2004. Warner Bros. continues its involvement with the program by having responsibilities for barter ad sales for Access Hollywood.

On September 13, 2010, Access Hollywood began broadcasting in high definition. On May 1, 2012, NBCUniversal Television Distribution announced it would renew Access Hollywood for three additional years through the 2014–15 season.

The program changed its name to simply Access on December 11, 2017.

On August 22, 2019, it was officially announced that Access and Access Live will receive an on-air refresh for their 24th and 10th seasons, respectively, with new names, logos, graphics and theme music, starting on September 9. Access returned to its original Access Hollywood name and begin airing live in the East Coast, with Access Live also rebranding as Access Daily. The program would also debut a second spin-off in the fall entitled All Access— which features long-form reports on true-crime and human interest stories and air initially on six NBC owned-and-operated stations. Former Extra host Mario Lopez also joined all three programs as co-host.

On April 12, 2021, Access Hollywood and Access Daily renewed for a three additional seasons through 2025.

On-air staff

Current on-air staff

Anchors
 Kit Hoover – anchor (2010–present)
 Mario Lopez – anchor (2019–present)
 Scott Evans – anchor/weekend anchor (2019–present; previously served as senior correspondent from 2015 to 2019)

Correspondents
 Zuri Hall - correspondent (2019–present)
 Jason Kennedy – 
 Sibley Scoles – weekend anchor/correspondent (2019–present)
 Tim Vincent – European correspondent (2005–present)

Former on-air staff
 Michelle Beadle – correspondent (2012–2014; later at ESPN)
 Billy Bush – correspondent (2001–2004), anchor/voice over/executive producer (2004–2016; later at NBC's Today, now host of Extra)
 Steven "Cojo" Cojocaru – fashion correspondent (2000–2003, later at Entertainment Tonight)
 Giselle Fernández – weekday anchor/correspondent (1996–1999)
 Liz Hernandez - correspondent (2014–2017)
 Jill Martin - guest correspondent (2011–2013; now contributor on NBC News' weekday morning program Today)
 Larry Mendte – weekday/weekend anchor (1996–1997, now a public-affairs host for two TV stations in the Northeast and a host at WABC)
 Maria Menounos – correspondent (2005–2011; later at Extra and E! News)
 Natalie Morales – anchor (2016–2019; later at NBC News as Today west coast anchor and correspondent for Dateline NBC, now co-host of The Talk)
 Nancy O'Dell – weekday/weekend anchor/correspondent (1996–2009, later at Entertainment Tonight and PEOPLE, The TV Show!)
 Pat O'Brien – weekday/weekend anchor/correspondent (1997–2004, later at The Insider; now co-host of Adult Swim's entertainment variety program: Hot Package)
 Amy Powell - correspondent (2013–2018)
 Jeff Probst – correspondent (1996–1998; now host of Survivor)
 Tony Potts – weekend anchor/correspondent (1999–2011; now at CNN and HLN)
 Shaun Robinson – weekend anchor/correspondent (1999–2015)
 Liliana Vazquez - fashion correspondent (2015–2019; later co-anchor of E! News)

Segments
Access Hollywood Nation, which is a viewer's choice allowing a choice of which stories will be carried in the show.
In Case You Missed It, a recap of the previous night/weekend in pop culture, including film, television and music.
Watch This, suggestion segment of films and shows to watch by the show's correspondents and critics.
The Final 45, a closing credits segment with a quick rundown of the day's news.
Access Express, a segment matching the defunct Entertainment Tonight segment "Real or Rumor?" where stories are confirmed or debunked.

Access Across America
In 2005, Access Hollywood went on a month-long roadtrip called Access Across America while the studio underwent a major overhaul. The show's new set was done in  pastel colors with a modern flair, separating its look from other similar shows, including rival Entertainment Tonight. The new look also included a brand-new graphics package. Access Hollywood was taped at Studio 1 at The Burbank Studios (formerly NBC Studios) in Burbank, California, former home of The Tonight Show Starring Johnny Carson. With Days of Our Lives, it was one of two remaining NBC-produced programs as of 2014 originating from Burbank; On 2015 Access Hollywood moved to Universal City, California and Universal Studios Hollywood as NBC's operations continued to combine in Universal City.

Spin-offs
The program has had some short-lived spin-offs in the last few years, including AMC Access for the AMC channel, and Real Access (the first teen-oriented entertainment news program, and the only attempt so far at an entertainment news program aimed at teens on television) for The N and Nickelodeon. The network most recently produced the African-American oriented TV One Access for the TV One cable channel. The programs formerly did entertainment segments for NBCUniversal's cable news channel titled Access MSNBC, though these have been withdrawn as MSNBC's news coverage has become mainly political.

Access Daily with Mario & Kit

A spin-off of Access Hollywood, called Access Hollywood Live, debuted on September 13, 2010. The daytime talk show - currently hosted by Mario Lopez and Kit Hoover, features entertainment news stories and in-studio guests. The program was initially seen only on NBC owned-and-operated stations in six markets and Fox owned-and-operated stations in six other major markets, all on stations that already carry the flagship series; since September 2011, the program also began being distributed to non-network owned stations that also carry the flagship series. The show airs live at 11:00 am Eastern Time (8:00 am in Los Angeles where the studios are located). The show changed its name to Access Live on December 11, 2017, and again to Access Daily on September 9, 2019. In 2022, the show was renamed Access Daily with Mario & Kit and Evans was no longer a co-host but still with the show as a correspondent.

Access Daily was originally recorded at The Burbank Studios in Burbank, California; it currently broadcasts from 10 Universal City Plaza in Universal City, California, where it has been recorded since June 2015. On occasion, the program broadcasts shows on location outside Studio 1A on the Today plaza at Rockefeller Center in New York City. On May 1, 2012, along with Access Hollywood's renewal for three additional seasons, NBCUniversal Television Distribution announced it would give Access Hollywood Live a third season renewal for the 2012–13 season. On April 12, 2021, the show renewed for a three additional seasons through 2025.

All Access
A second spin-off, entitled, All Access premiered on September 9, 2019, and features long-form reports on true-crime and human interest stories and air initially on six NBC owned-and-operated stations. The show is hosted by Mario Lopez, Kit Hoover and Scott Evans with Sibley Scoles as correspondent. On October 2, 2019, Zuri Hall joined as co-host. On March 11, 2021, it was announced that the show was canceled and last episode would to air in June.

International versions & airings 
In Canada, Rogers Sports & Media's Omni Television airs the United States version of Access Live while Independent station CHCH-DT began airing the half hour weekday United States version in fall 2014; Bell Media channel CTV 2 used to air the half hour weekday United States version since fall 2011 but it was discontinued in 2013.

The United Kingdom version began in 2003 hosted by Kate Garraway and Vincent.

There was a short-lived national version for the Ireland on the channel previously named "Channel 6", hosted by Jenny Buckley from 2006.

Spoofs
The show was parodied in the show Arthur in the special Arthur, It's Only Rock N' Roll when a spoof named Access Elwood interviewed the band U Stink.
In the South Park episode "Free Hat", a show airs called "Excess Hollywood" with a look-alike of then host Pat O'Brien.
The show is also parodied in the sitcom BoJack Horseman as "Excess Hollywood", later renamed to "Excess " after BoJack steals the D from the Hollywood Sign.
 Craig Ferguson often parodies Access Hollywood on The Late Late Show with Craig Ferguson in a segment called Access Extratainment Tonight (a portmanteau of Access Hollywood, Extra and Entertainment Tonight) with Ferguson as "Barney Slash".
In The Simpsons Movie, the show is mentioned in an argument between Homer and Marge Simpson.
In The Simpsons episode "Hello Gutter, Hello Fadder", when (then) hosts Pat O'Brien & Nancy O'Dell guest star as hosts of Access Springfield.

See also
 Donald Trump Access Hollywood tape
Entertainment Tonight

References

External links
 AccessOnline.com – Official Access Website
 AccessOnline.com/Live – Official Access Live Website
 
 

1996 American television series debuts
1990s American television news shows
2000s American television news shows
2010s American television news shows
2020s American television news shows
English-language television shows
Entertainment news shows in the United States
First-run syndicated television programs in the United States
Television series by Universal Television
Television series by Warner Bros. Television Studios
Television series by New World Television
Television series by 20th Century Fox Television
Television shows filmed in Los Angeles